Fighting Ruben Wolfe is a young adult fiction novel by Markus Zusak. Originally published in Australia by Omnibus in 2000, the first American Hardcover printing was by Arthur A. Levine Books, an imprint of Scholastic Press, February, 2001.  First soft cover edition was printed in February, 2002. Fighting Ruben Wolfe is the second book featuring brothers Cameron and Ruben Wolfe and their family.  The first book is The Underdog and the third book is When Dogs Cry.

Awards 
Honour Book - CBCA Children's Book of the Year Award: Older Readers (2001)

References 

2000 Australian novels
Australian young adult novels
Novels by Markus Zusak